Dr Samuel Rabbeth (19 August 1858 – 20 October 1884) was a young doctor who died from diphtheria contracted from a child patient whom he tried to save. His tragic death was widely reported in the newspapers and there is a memorial to him in Postman's Park, London.

Early life and education
He was born at St Pancras, London in 1858, his father, John Edward, working at Coutts' bank in the Strand. In 1881 up to his death in 1900 his father was living at Middleton Lodge, Upper Richmond Road, Barnes.

He was educated at King's College School, London, and at King's College Hospital and was elected an associate at the College. He was admitted to the Royal College of Surgeons and passed his M.B. examination in Obstetric medicine, receiving the University Scholarship and the Gold Medal, at the University of London in 1883. He was appointed senior resident medical officer at the Royal Free Hospital, London, in April 1884.

Death 

He was senior medical officer of the Royal Free Hospital when a four-year old child, Leon Rex Jennings, was admitted suffering from diphtheria. In order to save the child's life it was necessary to perform a tracheotomy, but the windpipe was found to be blocked. Dr Rabbeth used a tube to suck the matter out of the throat of the child. Afterwards he found that he was suffering from diphtheria and died on 20 October surrounded by his relations, friends and colleagues. The child later died.

Memorials 
He was buried in Barnes Old Cemetery together with his father and aunt; his career is described in detail on his headstone.

A brass tablet was placed in the inquest room of the Royal Free Hospital with the inscription "This tablet has been erected by the authorities of the Royal Free Hospital, Gray's-inn-road, and the medical staff to the memory of Samuel Rabbeth, M.B., M.R.C.S., Senior Resident Medical Officer of this hospital, who sacrificed his own life in the endeavour to save that of a little child, a patient under his care. Died 20th October, 1884; aged 26 years." A scholarship was named after him.

There is a memorial to him in Postman's Park, London and another in King's College Chapel at the Strand, London.

References

1858 births
1884 deaths
19th-century English medical doctors
Alumni of King's College London
People from St Pancras, London
People educated at King's College School, London
Deaths from diphtheria
Burials at Barnes Cemetery